Valiakoikkal Temple is the family temple of the Pandalam Royal Family. The temple is located at Pandalam in Pathanamthitta District, Kerala. It is situated within the Pandalam Palace premises. The main deity is Ayyappan. Procession of the Thiruvabharanam (Sacred Ornaments) towards Sabarimala shrine starts from the Valiyakoikkal temple every year before the Makaravilakku festival. Millions of devotees visit this temple every year during the Makaravilakku festive season.

See also
Pandalam
Ayyappan
Sabarimala
Thiruvabharanam
Pandalam Palace
Temples of Kerala

References

Hindu temples in Pathanamthitta district
Hindu pilgrimage sites in India